Diego Valdés (born 21 March 1983) is a Chilean sprinter. He competed in the men's 4 × 100 metres relay at the 2000 Summer Olympics.

References

1983 births
Living people
Athletes (track and field) at the 2000 Summer Olympics
Chilean male sprinters
Olympic athletes of Chile
Place of birth missing (living people)
South American Games silver medalists for Chile
South American Games medalists in athletics
Competitors at the 2002 South American Games
21st-century Chilean people